Oniscodesmidae is a family of millipedes belonging to the order Polydesmida.

Genera:
 Amphitomeus Verhoeff, 1941
 Barrodesmus Chamberlin, 1940
 Crypturodesmus Silvestri, 1897
 Detodesmus Cook, 1896
 Glomerisphaerium Verhoeff, 1951
 Huanucodesmus
 Katantodesmus Attems, 1898
 Lathrurodesmus Silvestri, 1910
 Ligiodesmus Pocock, 1909
 Lignydesmus Cook, 1896
 Oniscodesmus Gervais & Goudot, 1844
 Perusphaerium Verhoeff, 1951
 Tomeosphaerium Verhoeff, 1941

References

Polydesmida